Toza is a corregimiento in Natá District, Coclé Province, Panama. Its population as of 1990 was 1,666; its population as of 2000 was 1,884.

References

Corregimientos of Coclé Province